Rolf Sagen (21 December 1940 – 6 April 2017) was a Norwegian author. He was curator and daily leader of the Bergen Academy of Writing. 

He wrote novels, short stories, scripts and children's books. He debuted in 1968 with the poetry collection Dørklinker, which won Tarjei Vesaas' debutantpris. In 1976, he took the Norwegian Critics Prize for Literature for the novel Mørkets gjerninger.

Sagen died on 6 April 2017.

Bibliography
Dørklinker – poetry collection, (1966)
Kvengedal – collage, (1970)
Mørkets ugjerninger – novel, (1976)
Mercedesryttaren – documentary novel, (1988)
Reisa til Leit – children's book, (1989)
Lyden av vatn – novel, (1990)
Sauenes liv – picture book, (1994)
Den gongen eg var elvefiskar – picture book, (1995)
Kjærasten min og andre dikt for store og små – poetry collection, (1996)
Bergfri og Kakaoen leitar etter morfar – picture book, (1997)
Bergfri og epleslangen – picture book, (1998)
Bergfri og kattungen – picture book, (1999)
Sørgedans – poetry, (2000)
Hundre bønder – documentary novel, (2001)
Reisa til D. – short story collection, (2002)
Steinar Foten og vekkarmannen – children's book, (2002)
Skog – novel, (2004)

Prizes 
Tarjei Vesaas' debutantpris, 1968, for Dørklinker
Norwegian Critics Prize for Literature 1976, for Mørkets gjerninger
Samlagsprisen 2003

References 

1940 births
2017 deaths
Norwegian writers
Norwegian children's writers
Norwegian Critics Prize for Literature winners